Butry-sur-Oise is a commune in the Val-d'Oise department in Île-de-France in northern France. Valmondois station, situated in the commune, has rail connections to Persan, Creil, Pontoise and Paris.

Local attractions
Musée des tramways à vapeur et des chemins de fer secondaires français

See also
Communes of the Val-d'Oise department

References

External links
Official website 

Association of Mayors of the Val d'Oise 

Communes of Val-d'Oise